The Students' Choice Award for Favorite Actress (Chinese: 北京大学生电影节最受欢迎女演员奖) is a main category of Beijing College Student Film Festival.

Winners

References

External links
 Past Winners

Favorite Actress
Awards for actresses